Charlton Musgrove is a village and civil parish in Somerset, England, situated  north east of Wincanton in the South Somerset district.  The village has a population of 398. The parish includes the hamlets of Barrow, Holbrook, Southmarsh, and part of Shalford.

History

In 1066 the holder of the manor was Godman but passed to Robert FitzGerold by the time of the Domesday Book in 1086. The parish of Charlton Musgrove was part of the Norton Ferris Hundred.

In 1861 the Dorset Central Railway opened a standard gauge track through the western side of the parish, joining Templecombe with Cole. It was linked to Glastonbury in the following year by the Somerset and Dorset Railway and was double lined in 1887. The line was closed in 1966.

Governance

The parish council has responsibility for local issues, including setting an annual precept (local rate) to cover the council's operating costs and producing annual accounts for public scrutiny. The parish council evaluates local planning applications and works with the local police, district council officers, and neighbourhood watch groups on matters of crime, security, and traffic. The parish council's role also includes initiating projects for the maintenance and repair of parish facilities, as well as consulting with the district council on the maintenance, repair, and improvement of highways, drainage, footpaths, public transport, and street cleaning. Conservation matters (including trees and listed buildings) and environmental issues are also the responsibility of the council.

The village falls within the Non-metropolitan district of South Somerset, which was formed on 1 April 1974 under the Local Government Act 1972, having previously been part of Wincanton Rural District. The district council is responsible for local planning and building control, local roads, council housing, environmental health, markets and fairs, refuse collection and recycling, cemeteries and crematoria, leisure services, parks, and tourism.

Somerset County Council is responsible for running the largest and most expensive local services such as education, social services, libraries, main roads, public transport, policing and fire services, Trading Standards, waste disposal and strategic planning.

It is also part of the Somerton and Frome county constituency represented in the House of Commons of the Parliament of the United Kingdom. It elects one Member of Parliament (MP) by the first past the post system of election, and was part of the South West England constituency of the European Parliament prior to Britain leaving the European Union in January 2020, which elected seven MEPs using the d'Hondt method of party-list proportional representation.

Religious sites

The village is unusual in having two churches and two centres. The older Church of St Stephen dates from the 13th century. It has been designated as a Grade II* listed building. The second centre is said to have originated when people fled to avoid the plague. The newer centre had no church until 1877 when a chapel of ease at Barrow Lane, dedicated to St John the Baptist, was given by Mrs. Emma Frances Davies (née Leir), the widow of a former rector, daughter of Rev William Leir (1768–1863). It is of stone in a 13th-century style, designed by Charles Edward Davis of Bath, and comprises an apsidal chancel and a nave with a southern bell tower. The Leir family themselves have provided a number of rectors to the parish.

Stavordale Priory, now a private home owned by Sir Cameron Mackintosh, is thought to be linked to the village's Old Church near the altar by a tunnel, perhaps used as a priest's escape route, some two miles in length. The building has 13th-century origins, having been founded by a member of the Lovel family, and was converted around the time of the Dissolution of the Monasteries, after the Priory merged with Taunton in 1533. The Priory of the Augustinian Order was first mentioned in 1243. The bell tower is known to have existed by 1374, and the church was refitted and rebuilt around 1439. The chantry of Jesus was described as having been "recently completed" in 1526.

Notable people

William Arnold an important master mason who flourished between 1595 and 1637 lived in the village in 1595 where he was church warden. His first known commission was for the design of Montacute House around 1598.

References

External links

 Charlton Musgrove community website

Villages in South Somerset
Civil parishes in Somerset